Mizuuchi (written: 水内) is a Japanese surname. Notable people with the surname include:

, Japanese voice actor
, Japanese biochemist
, Japanese footballer

Japanese-language surnames